Sethupathis were 17th century rulers of the Ramnad and Sivaganga regions in southern India, considered the protectors of the Rama Sethu (Adam's Bridge). Sethupathi may also refer to:
Sethupathi (surname)
Sethupathi, 2016 Indian Tamil-language film
Sethupathi IPS, 1994 Indian Tamil-language film
Annabelle Sethupathi, 2021 Indian film by Deepak Sundarrajan
Sethupathi Higher Secondary School in Madurai, India

See also 

 Sethu (disambiguation)
 Pati (disambiguation)